Aliksei Uladzimiravich Mzhachyk (30 June 1996 – 1 August 2021) was a Belarusian weightlifter. He placed 12th in the men's +105 kg event at the 2016 Summer Olympics held in Rio de Janeiro, Brazil.

In age-specific categories he won the bronze medal at the 2017 European Junior & U23 Weightlifting Championships. He finished eighth at the 2017 European Weightlifting Championships and thirteenth at the 2018 World Weightlifting Championships.

Mzhachyk died in a car accident in Germany on 1 August 2021.  He was 25.

References

External links
 

1996 births
2021 deaths
Sportspeople from Pinsk
Belarusian male weightlifters
Olympic weightlifters of Belarus
Weightlifters at the 2016 Summer Olympics
Road incident deaths in Germany
20th-century Belarusian people
21st-century Belarusian people